The women's 100 metres event at the 1982 Commonwealth Games was held on 3 and 4 October at the QE II Stadium in Brisbane, Australia.

Medalists

Results

Heats
Qualification: First 4 in each heat (Q) and the next 2 fastest (q) qualify for the semifinals.

Wind:Heat 1: +2.8 m/s, Heat 2: +2.8 m/s, Heat 3: +4.4 m/s, Heat 4: +3.4 m/s

Semifinals
Qualification: First 4 in each semifinal (Q) and the next 1 fastest (q) qualify for the final.

Wind:Heat 1: +3.2 m/s, Heat 2: +3.4 m/s

Final
Wind: +1.4 m/s

References

Heats results (The Sydney Morning Herald)
Semifinals & Final results (The Sydney Morning Herald)
Semifinals & Final results (The Canberra Times)
Australian results 

Athletics at the 1982 Commonwealth Games
1982